Sihar railway station is located in Sindh, Pakistan.

See also
 List of railway stations in Pakistan
 Pakistan Railways

References

Railway stations in Dadu District
Railway stations on Kotri–Attock Railway Line (ML 2)